Club Olímpico de Totana is a Spanish football team from Totana, Murcia. It was founded in 1961. The team currently plays in the Tercera División - Group 13 (Region of Murcia), which is the 4th tier of Spanish football.

History
Founded in 1961. In the 1980-1981 season, they debuted in Tercera División.

Season to season

26 seasons in Tercera División

Honours

 Tercera División

Winners (1): 1999–2000

References

External links
Official website (under construction)
Facebook 
Soccerway

Football clubs in the Region of Murcia
Association football clubs established in 1961
1961 establishments in Spain